Colombia's Next Top Model is a Colombian reality television series, based on Tyra Banks' America's Next Top Model. It is the third franchise in Latin America after Brazil's Next Top Model and Mexico's Next Top Model.  The series began to air on Caracol TV on January 8, 2013.

Overview
The series features a group of young women who compete for the title of "Colombia's Next Top Model" and a chance to begin their career in the modeling industry.

The second season aired on January 13, 2014. Carolina Cruz was introduced as the new image of the contest and Franklin Ramos remained as the tutor. On the other hand, Kika Rocha and Catalina Aristizábal remained part of the team as judges and Mauricio Vélez entered the show as a replacement of Raúl Higuera who was no longer part of the team for season 2.

Judges

Cycles

References

External links
  Official website

 
2013 Colombian television series debuts
2017 Colombian television series endings
Caracol Televisión original programming
Television series by Fremantle (company)
Television series by CBS Studios
Colombian television series based on American television series